Judson Harmon (February 3, 1846February 22, 1927) was an American Democratic politician from Ohio. He served as United States Attorney General under President Grover Cleveland and later served as the 45th governor of Ohio.

Early life
Harmon was born in Newtown, Ohio and named after Adoniram Judson, the famed American Baptist foreign missionary. His parents were Benjamin Franklin Harmon and Julia Brunson, a native of Olean, New York. His ancestors on both sides of his family were English and included men who served in the colonial wars and in the American Revolutionary War, including Cornelius Brooks and his father James Brooks.

Judson was a distant relative of Frances Folsom, the wife of President Grover Cleveland, through her mother Emma Harmon.

Harmon graduated from Denison University in 1866. He graduated from the Cincinnati Law School and was admitted to the bar in 1869. Harmon was elected judge of the Common Pleas Court in 1876 but left months later to run unsuccessfully for the State Senate. He was elected judge of the Superior Court of Cincinnati in 1878 and served until he resigned in 1887 to resume the practice of law.

Attorney General
He was appointed Attorney General by President Cleveland on June 8, 1895 upon the elevation of Richard Olney to become United States Secretary of State. Harmon served out the remainder of Cleveland's second term in office. Shortly after his appointment, Harmon urged Congress to fix some of the weaknesses in the Sherman Antitrust Act. Harmon also issued the most explicit statement of what became known as the Harmon doctrine of absolute sovereignty, "the rules, principles and precedents of international law impose no liability or obligation upon the United States" in a case involving a claim by Mexico for damages from diverting the waters of the Rio Grande.

Governor

Harmon was elected as Ohio governor in 1908. In 1910, Harmon was re-elected for a second term as governor, this time defeating future President of the United States Warren G. Harding.

Presidential candidate
In June 1912, Harmon led the Ohio delegation to the Democratic National Convention in Baltimore, Maryland. There, Harmon was nominated as a candidate for the presidency. That was largely as a favorite son of the State of Ohio, Harmon found support from elsewhere and on the first ballot of the Convention, and he received the votes of 148 delegates. However, since no candidate received the necessary two thirds of the votes, balloting continued.

By the time of the 26th ballot, no candidate had yet received the nomination for president, and Harmon's support had dwindled to 29 votes, as the Convention tended to coalesce around the two leading candidates: Speaker of the House of Representatives Champ Clark of Missouri and New Jersey Governor Woodrow Wilson.  Balloting continued until the 39th ballot, when the support of William Jennings Bryan helped Wilson obtain the votes necessary to become the nominee.

Retirement
Following the convention, Harmon returned home to Ohio to serve out the rest of his term as governor of the state. Accordingly, Harmon left office in January 1913, upon completion of this second term.

Family
In 1870 Judson married Olivia Scobey, the daughter of a leading physician in Hamilton.  They had three daughters. Harmon and family were residents of Wyoming, OH and lived at 205 Worthington Ave. He served as Wyoming's third Mayor and was the village's most distinguished public servant.

Legacy
Harmon County, Oklahoma, is named after him.

References

External links

1846 births
1927 deaths
Democratic Party governors of Ohio
United States Attorneys General
Candidates in the 1912 United States presidential election
20th-century American politicians
Denison University alumni
University of Cincinnati College of Law alumni
Cleveland administration cabinet members
19th-century American politicians
Judges of the Superior Court of Cincinnati
American people of English descent